WQHL (1250 AM) is a News Talk Information–formatted radio station licensed to Live Oak, Florida, United States. The station operates under the branding The BIG Talker in simulcast with Lake City–licensed WDSR (1340 AM). The station is owned by Southern Stone Communications as part of a conglomerate with Live Oak–licensed country music station WQHL-FM (98.1 FM), Live Oak–licensed sports radio station WJZS (106.1 FM), and Five Points–licensed hot adult contemporary station WCJX (106.5 FM); WQHL is also sister to WDSR and Lake City–licensed classic hits station WNFB (94.3 FM) under a local marketing agreement with their owner Newman Media, Inc.

History
WQHL went on the air as WNER in 1949. In 1953, the station was purchased by Norm Protsman. He would later purchase WQHL-FM (98.1 FM). In 1988, Protsman sold the two stations to Day Communications.

In 2013, the WQHL stations were sold by Black Crow Media Group to Southern Stone Communications.

Programming
WDSR/WQHL currently feature syndicated programming from Premiere Networks, including The Clay Travis and Buck Sexton Show and The Sean Hannity Show. The station also airs news programming from Fox News Radio.

Translator
WQHL operates a FM translator in the local Live Oak area:

References

External links

QHL
News and talk radio stations in the United States
Suwannee County, Florida